Vancouver Challenger can refer to one of two Challenger tennis tournaments held in Vancouver, British Columbia, Canada.

Odlum Brown Vancouver Open, the current event, held for both men's and women's players
Vancouver Challenger (1993), a one-time held event, in February 1993